Hans Svendsgård  (19 July 1937 – 15 July 1996) was a Norwegian politician.

He was born in Meløy to Albert Ole Svendsgård and Helmine Taraldsen. He was elected representative to the Storting for the period 1981–1985 for the Conservative Party, and reelected for the period 1985–1989.

References

1937 births
1996 deaths
People from Meløy
Conservative Party (Norway) politicians
Members of the Storting